Aiysha Hart (born 8 August 1990) is a British-Saudi actress and screenwriter best known for playing DS Sam Railston in Line of Duty, Ariadne in the BBC drama series Atlantis, Mona in independent thriller Honour, and Polaire in Colette. She also plays Miriam in the Sky One and AMC adaptation of A Discovery of Witches.

Early life
Hart has mixed parentage; her father is Saudi and her mother is British. She grew up between Saudi Arabia and London. Hart graduated with First Class Honours in English Literature from King's College London.

Filmography

References

External links

1990 births
Living people
Alumni of King's College London
21st-century English actresses
English television actresses
English people of Saudi Arabian descent